Robert Lee may refer to:

Politicians
 Robert atte Lee (1379–1386), MP for Reading, England

 Robert Lee, 4th Earl of Lichfield (1706–1776), British peer and politician
 Robert Lee (Canadian politician) (1862–1925), mayor of Edmonton, Alberta
 Robert Emmett Lee (1868–1916), Democratic member of the U.S. House of Representatives from Pennsylvania
 Robert Quincy Lee (1869–1930), U.S. Representative from Texas
 Robert Lee (Lord Mayor) (died 1605), English merchant who was Lord Mayor of London in 1602
 Robert Lee Wai-wang, Hong Kong Legislative Council member

Military
 Robert C. Lee (1888–1971), US Navy officer
 Robert E. Lee (1807–1870), American Civil War Confederate general
 Robert E. Lee Jr. (1843–1914), soldier during the American Civil War, later a planter, businessman, and author
 Robert Merrill Lee (1909–2003), United States Air Force general
 Robert Scothrup Lee (1822–1916), American Civil War Confederate veteran

Writers and academics
 Robert N. Lee (1890–1964), American screenwriter
 Robert E. Lee (playwright) (1918–1994), playwright
 Robert Lee (obstetrician) (1793–1877), Regius Professor of Midwifery, University of Glasgow
 Robert G. Lee, professor of American studies at Brown University
 Robert Lee (historian) (1959–2010), English historian

Sportsmen
 Robert Lee (golfer) (born 1961), English golfer
 Robert Lee (canoeist) (born 1956), member of the Australian sprint canoe team at the 1980 Summer Olympics
 Rob Lee (born 1966), English footballer
 Robert Lee (basketball) (born 1968), head coach of the Louisiana-Lafayette Ragin' Cajuns men's basketball team

Actors
 Robert Lee (voice actor) (born 1957), narrator of MythBusters
 Robert Ya Fu Lee (1913–1986), Chinese British film and television actor
 Robert Isaac Lee (1956–2004), Chinese American film and television actor

Religion
 Robert Lee (minister) (1804–1868), 19th-century Church of Scotland minister
 Robert V. Lee, humanitarian and Episcopal priest
 Robert G. Lee (minister), U.S. 20th-century Southern Baptist minister
 Robert W. Lee IV, American minister and newspaper columnist

Other people
 Robert Lee, Lord Lee (1830–1890) Scottish law lord, Senator of the College of Justice, Fellow of the Royal Society of Edinburgh
 Robert Lee (dentist) (1920–2010), American dentist who emigrated to Ghana
 Robert Lee Jun-fai (born 1948), Hong Kong musician and the brother of Bruce Lee
Robbie Lee (musician), American  composer and multi-instrumentalist
 Robert Lee (teacher) (1837–1922), New Zealand teacher, school inspector, and educationalist
 Robert C. T. Lee (born 1923), Chinese-American veterinarian and educator
 Robert H. Lee (born 1933), Canadian businessman and philanthropist
 Robert Lee (sports announcer), American sports announcer, currently works for ESPN

Other uses
 Robert Lee, Texas, a US city named after the general

See also
 Bob Lee (disambiguation)
 Bobby Lee (disambiguation)
 Robert E. Lee (disambiguation)
 Robert Leigh (disambiguation)
 Bert Lee (disambiguation)